This is a list of episodes for The High Chaparral, a Western-themed television series which aired on NBC from 1967 to 1971. This series consists of 98 one-hour episodes over four seasons.

Series overview

Episodes

Season 1 (1967–1968)

Season 2 (1968–1969)

Season 3 (1969–1970)

Season 4 (1970–1971)

External links 
 

High Chaparral